The 1988–89 Asian Club Championship was the 8th edition of the annual Asian club football competition hosted by Asian Football Confederation.

Al-Sadd of Qatar won the final and became Asian champions for the first time.

Qualifying Group round

Group 1

All matches were played in Doha, Qatar.

Group 2

All matches were played in Sharjah, United Arab Emirates.

Playoff for 1st place

1 Group 2 was also the Gulf Cooperation Council Club Tournament. 
2 Fanja played only in the GCC Tournament.

Group 3

All matches were played at the Salt Lake Stadium in Calcutta, India.

Group 4

All match were played at the Mirpur Stadium in Dhaka, Bangladesh.

Group 5

All match were played in Bangkok, Thailand.

Group 6

All matches were played in Guangzhou, China PR.

Semi Final Group round

Group A

All match were played in Guangzhou, China PR.

Group B

All match were played in Kuantan, Malaysia.

Final

Al-Sadd won by away goals rule (a).

References

External links
Asian Club Competitions 1989 at RSSSF.com

1989 in Asian football
1988 in Asian football
1988–89